Frederick Blinkhorn (2 August 1901 – 1983) was an English professional footballer who played as a full back in the Football League for Burnley.

References

1901 births
1983 deaths
Footballers from Bolton
English footballers
Association football fullbacks
Leigh Genesis F.C. players
Burnley F.C. players
English Football League players